Black+Decker Inc. is an American manufacturer of power tools, accessories, hardware, home improvement products, home appliances and fastening systems headquartered in Towson, Maryland, north of Baltimore, Maryland, USA, where the company was originally established in 1910. On March 12, 2010, Black & Decker merged with Stanley Works to become Stanley Black & Decker. It remains as a wholly owned subsidiary of that company.

History

1910-1974
1910 – "The Black & Decker Manufacturing Company" was founded by S. Duncan Black (1883–1951) and Alonzo G. Decker (1884–1956), as a small machine shop in Baltimore in September. Decker, who had only a seventh grade education, had met Black in 1906, when they were both 23-year-old workers at the Rowland Telegraph Company. With only $1,200 between them, one of their first jobs was designing machinery for making milk bottle caps and candy dipping.
1912 – The Black and Decker "Hexagon" logo symbol was introduced, symbolizing the head of a hexagonal bolt found in machine shops. It was used in one form or another from 1912 to 2014.
1917 – Black & Decker invented and patented the hand-held electric drill with a pistol grip and trigger switch.
 –– For many decades the director of design was Glenn Calvin Wilhide, a friend of Walter Gropius and other industrial designers of the day. Wilhide filed many US patents for Black & Decker.
1917 – The first factory was opened in Towson, Maryland.
1919 – Company reaches $1,000,000 in sales.
1928 – Acquired Van Dorn Electric Tool Company of Cleveland, Ohio.
1936 – Common stock begins trading on the New York Stock Exchange.
1941 August – Wilhide's patent for a portable power driven tool unit granted.
1943 – Received the Army-Navy "E" Award for production, one of four World War II (1939/1941-1945) citations awarded to the company.
1949 – First Black & Decker U.S. trademark awarded.
1951 – Alonzo G. Decker, Sr. becomes president
1960 – Acquired DeWalt from American Machine and Foundry.

1975-2008
1975 – Francis P. Lucier succeeded son of one of the founders Alonzo G. Decker, Jr.(1908-2002), as chairman of the board, the first time a family member did not hold the post.
1984 – Acquired small-appliance business from General Electric Company.
1986 – Nolan D. Archibald is named chief executive officer.
1989 – Acquired Emhart Corporation  which includes the brand names Kwikset, Price Pfister faucets, Molly wall anchors, POP rivets, True Temper (both hardware and sports equipment) and other consumer and commercial products. Inducted into the Space Foundation's Space Technology Hall of Fame for its cordless power tool achievements and contributions to NASA's Gemini and Apollo programs.
1990 – True Temper hardware is sold to Huffy, and then sold to US Industries (owner of Ames) which later became Ames True Temper, which is now owned by Griffon Corporation. 
1996 – Sold small-appliance business to Windmere Durable Holdings. In May 2000, Windmere Durable Holdings changes its corporate name to Applica Inc.
2000 – Alonzo G. Decker, Jr. resigns from the board, at age 92, two years before his death.

2009-present
2010 – Black & Decker merges with Stanley Works to become Stanley Black & Decker.
2012 – Stanley Black & Decker sells its Hardware and Home Improvevement group (HHI) to Spectrum Brands. Sale includes the lock business, as well as the related manufacturing subsidirary in Taiwan (Tong Lung). , Spectrum was in negotiations to sell its HHI assets to Swedish lock manufacturer Assa Abloy, but were making adjustments in response to the United States Department of Justice findings of antitrust issues.
2014 – Rebranded from Black & Decker to Black+Decker
2017 – Stanley Black & Decker purchases Craftsman from Sears (Sears, Roebuck & Company).
2017 – Stovekraft entered a licensing agreement with Black+Decker to sell the latter's products in the Indian market.

Portfolio

Recent
As of 2017 Q4, Stanley Black & Decker's brand portfolio included:
 STANLEY (formerly known as The Stanley Works, started as Stanley's Bolt Manufactory, founded by Frederick Trent Stanley in 1843, and merging with the Stanley Rule and Level Company founded by Henry Stanley)

Retired

 Baldwin (sold to Spectrum Brands)
 Delta Machinery (sold to Chang Type Industrial)
 DeVilbiss Air Power (sold to MAT Holdings)
 Kwikset (sold to Spectrum Brands)
 Price Pfister (sold to Spectrum Brands)
 Weiser Lock (sold to Spectrum Brands)

References

Further reading
Black & Decker, 1989 Competition Commission report

External links

 
Companies based in Baltimore County, Maryland
Home improvement companies
Manufacturing companies based in Maryland
Manufacturing companies established in 1910
Power tool manufacturers
Towson, Maryland
American companies established in 1910
1910 establishments in Maryland
2010 mergers and acquisitions
Tool manufacturing companies of the United States